The twentieth edition of the 2021 GP de Plouay is part of the 2021 UCI Women's World Tour and will be held on 30 August 2021, in Plouay, France.

Teams
Riders from 15 teams will start the race. Each team has a maximum of six riders. 

UCI Women's WorldTeams

 
 
 
 
 
 
 
 
 

UCI Women's Continental Teams

 
 
 
 
 
 
 
 

{|
|Final general classification

References

External links
 Official site

GP de Plouay
GP de Plouay
GP de Plouay
GP de Plouay